Sir Richard Lyons  (1310–1381) was a prosperous City of London merchant, financier, and property developer, who held a monopoly on the sale of sweet wine in London, during the 14th century. He was a Privy Counsellor, an Alderman of the City, and a member of the Worshipful Company of Vintners, and served as both as Sheriff of London and MP for Essex.

Lyons was a lifelong friend of the poet Geoffrey Chaucer.

Lyons was killed by Wat Tyler during the Peasants' Revolt.

Family and Friends

Sir Richard was the most famous member of the Lyons family during the 14th century: he was a member of the Norfolk branch of the family. He was an illegitimate son of a Lyons father and a Flemish mother.

Lyons was a lifelong friend of the poet Geoffrey Chaucer and Chaucer’s father, a fellow vintner. Lyons employed Geoffrey as his deputy or Comptroller: although Lyons consistently engaged in vast fraud, on an unprecedented scale, of which Geoffrey Chaucer were necessarily aware, Geoffrey Chaucer repeatedly certified to the Exchequer, in 1374 and 1375, that no fraud was being committed by Lyons. Lyons was also a lifelong friend of John of Gaunt.

City of London Career

One of the leading merchants in the City of London, Lyons was a financier, merchant (in wine, wool, cloth, iron, and lead), shipowner, and property-developer. He had extensive business interests in Flanders and was extensively involved in overseas trade.

He was an Alderman of the City of London, a member of the Worshipful Company of Vintners, and served as Sheriff of London. Lyons was knighted and served as Privy Counsellor and as Edward III's financial agent. He was also the Head of a Commission convened to investigate an attack on Portuguese merchant ships, in 1371, Keeper of the King’s Monies at the Tower of London, in 1375, Collector of the Petty Customs, in 1373, and Collector of Customs and Subsidies in 1375.

Monopoly on  Sale of Sweet Wine
By virtue of his fraudulent engineering on the wine market, Lyons secured a practical monopoly on the London wine market, which lasted until his impeachment: he leased, from the City, the only three taverns in London permitted to sell sweet wines. It has been surmised that he acted as a broker for the Bardi banking family of Florence, from whom he took a large commission.

Prosperity
Lyons was extremely rich: At the time of his death, he owned lands in Essex, Kent, Suffolk, Surrey, Sussex, Middlesex, Hertfordshire, in addition to several properties in London, including a large house contiguous with the Guildhall of the merchants of the Hanse of Germany, in Thames Street, and property situated in Cosyn Lane in the Ropery. The Elizabethan antiquary John Stow noted that Lyons’s effigy, at St Martin Vintry, London, featured a large purse: in the words of D. Carlson, ‘the man was a wallet’.

Fraud and Extortion
Together with his close associate and fellow Privy Counsellor, William Latimer, 4th Baron Latimer, the King’s Chamberlain, Lyons was involved in some monumental financial frauds, including extortion, the deliberate retardation of the market at several ports, the engineering of the increase of the prices of foreign imports throughout the kingdom, and the abuse of Lyons’s position as collector of the wool subsidy to export his wool otherwise than through the staple at Calais, thereby avoiding duties. For this, Lyons and Latimer were impeached by the Good Parliament: this was the first case of impeachment in law. Following his impeachment, Lyons attempted to bribe Edward, the Black Prince, to whom he sent £1000 disguised as a barrel of sturgeon: Edward refused to accept the bribe and imprisoned Lyons. However, Edward died later in 1376, after which Lyons, due to his favour with John of Gaunt, was pardoned. Lyons served as MP for Essex in 1380.
Lyons established a perpetual chantry foundation at the Church of St James Garlickhithe, to which he donated vestments embroidered with lions. He is commemorated at the Church.

Death

Lyons was beheaded, at Cheapside, on 14 June 1381, by Wat Tyler during the Peasants’ Revolt of 1381. Froissart suggests that Lyons was killed in revenge for historical mistreatment of Wat Tyler: the chronicler Knighton, in contradistinction, contends that the rebellious Peasants targeted Lyons as a consequence of his associations with fraud and extortion, which had produced his vast wealth.

See also
Lyons family

References

1310 births
1381 deaths
Sheriffs of the City of London
Impeached British officials
Members of the Privy Council of England
Prisoners in the Tower of London
14th-century English businesspeople
English MPs January 1380
14th century in London